The siege of Mecca in September–November 683 was one of the early battles of the Second Fitna. The city of Mecca was a sanctuary for Abd Allah ibn al-Zubayr, who was among the most prominent challengers to the dynastic succession to the Caliphate by the Umayyad Yazid I. After nearby Medina, the other holy city of Islam, also rebelled against Yazid, the Umayyad ruler sent an army to subdue Arabia. The Umayyad army defeated the Medinans and took the city, but Mecca held out in a month-long siege, during which the Kaaba was damaged by fire. The siege ended when news came of Yazid's sudden death. The Umayyad commander, Husayn ibn Numayr al-Sakuni, after vainly trying to induce Ibn al-Zubayr to return with him to Syria and be recognized as Caliph, departed with his forces. Ibn al-Zubayr remained in Mecca throughout the civil war, but he was nevertheless soon acknowledged as Caliph across most of the Muslim world. It was not until 692, that the Umayyads were able to send another army which again besieged and captured Mecca, ending the civil war.

Background 
At the death of the founder of the Umayyad Caliphate, Mu'awiya I, in 680, the Muslim world was thrown into turmoil. Although Mu'awiya had named his son, Yazid I, as his heir, this choice was not universally recognized, especially by the old Medinan elites, who challenged the Umayyads' claim to the succession. Among them, the two chief candidates for the caliphate were the Alid Husayn ibn Ali (the grandson of Prophet Muhammad), and Abd Allah ibn al-Zubayr (a grandson of the first caliph, Abu Bakr, and nephew of Muhammad's wife A'isha). To avoid being forced to acknowledge Yazid, on the latter's accession the two men fled from Medina to Mecca. Husayn made for Kufa, where his supporters awaited him to rise in revolt against the Umayyads, but his convoy was intercepted and he was killed at the Battle of Karbala in October 680, leaving Ibn al-Zubayr as the leading contender and rival for the Umayyads. As long as Yazid lived, Ibn al-Zubayr denounced his rule from the sanctuary of Mecca but did not openly claim the caliphate, instead calling himself "the fugitive at the sanctuary" (al-ʿaʾidh biʾl-bayt) and insisting that the caliph should be chosen in the traditional manner, by a tribal assembly (shūrā) from among all the Quraysh, not just the Umayyads.

At first Yazid and his governors in Medina tried to negotiate with Ibn al-Zubayr, as well as the dissatisfied Ansar families. The Medinan aristocracy, however, who felt their position threatened by Mu'awiya's large-scale agricultural projects around their city, and regarded Yazid as unfit for the office of caliph due to his reputed dissolute lifestyle, led a public denunciation of their allegiance to Yazid, and expelled the Umayyad family members, some 1,000 in number (including the future caliph Marwan ibn al-Hakam and his sons), from their city. As a result, Yazid sent an army to subdue the province, and chose Muslim ibn Uqba al-Murri to lead it. Muslim's army of 12,000 Syrians indeed overcame the Medinans' resistance at the Battle of al-Harrah on 26 August 683 and proceeded to sack Medina—one of the impious acts for which the Umayyads are denounced in later Muslim tradition. For his sack of Medina, subsequent tradition remembers Muslim ibn Uqba as, in the words of Julius Wellhausen, the "heathen incarnate", although in the earlier sources he is represented as devout and reluctant to undertake the task assigned to him by the Caliph.

Siege 
After taking Medina, Muslim set out for Mecca, but on the way he fell ill and died at Mushallal, and command passed to his lieutenant Husayn ibn Numayr al-Sakuni. According to the account reported by al-Tabari, this was much against Uqba's will, but in accordance with the wishes of Yazid. 

Many of the Medinans had fled to Mecca, including the commander of the Qurayshites at the battle of al-Harra, Abd Allah ibn Muti, who played a leading role in Mecca's defense along with al-Mukhtar al-Thaqafi. Ibn al-Zubayr was also joined by Kharijites from Yamama (central Arabia), under the leadership of Najda ibn Amir al-Hanafi. Husayn's army arrived before Mecca in September. In a first battle, Ibn al-Zubayr proved victorious, but the Umayyads persisted, and on 24 September placed the city under siege, employing catapults to bombard it with stones.

Ibn al-Zubayr established his command post on the grounds of the Grand Mosque. On Sunday, 31 October, the Kaaba, over which a wooden structure covered with mattresses had been erected to protect it, caught fire and burned down, while the sacred Black Stone burst asunder. Many later sources ascribe the fault to the besiegers, with the result that "this siege and bombardment too figure prominently in the lists of Umayyad crimes" (G.R. Hawting), but more reliable accounts attribute the event to a torch borne by one of Ibn al-Zubayr's followers, which the wind wafted onto the building.

The siege continued for 64 days until 26 November, when news of Yazid's death (11 November) reached the besiegers. Husayn now entered into negotiations with Ibn al-Zubayr. Although the Umayyad court at Damascus promptly declared Yazid's sickly young son, Mu'awiya II, as caliph, Umayyad authority practically collapsed in the provinces and proved shaky even in the Umayyads' home province of Syria. Husayn was therefore willing to acknowledge Ibn al-Zubayr as caliph, provided that he would issue a pardon and follow him to Syria. Ibn al-Zubayr refused the last demand, since this would place him under the control of the Syrian elites, and Husayn with his army departed for Syria.

Aftermath 
The retreat of the Umayyad army left Ibn al-Zubayr in undisputed control of Mecca. With the collapse of Umayyad authority, he was soon acknowledged as the rightful caliph across most of the Muslim world, including northern Syria. His authority, however, remained mostly nominal. The Umayyads, under the leadership of Marwan ibn al-Hakam, managed to consolidate their position in Syria in the Battle of Marj Rahit, and even reclaimed Egypt, but an Umayyad attempt to recover control of Iraq was defeated by pro-Alid forces under Mukhtar al-Thaqafi near Mosul in August 686. Abd al-Malik, who had succeeded his father Marwan after the latter's death in April 685, thereafter restricted himself to securing his own position, while Ibn al-Zubayr's brother Mus'ab defeated Mukhtar at the Battle of Harura and gained control of all of Iraq in 687. In 691, Abd al-Malik managed to bring Zufar al-Kilabi's Qays back into the Umayyad fold, and advanced into the Iraq. Mus'ab was defeated and killed, and Umayyad authority re-established across the East. After another siege of Mecca which lasted from March–October 692, Ibn al-Zubayr was killed, and the civil war ended.

Rebuilding of the Kaaba 

After the Umayyads' departure, Ibn al-Zubayr initiated the rebuilding of the Kaaba, but most of the people, led by Ibn Abbas, had abandoned the city fearing divine retribution; it was only when Ibn al-Zubayr himself began to demolish the remains of the old building, that they were encouraged to return and aid him. Ibn al-Zubayr's reconstruction changed the original plan, incorporating modifications that Muhammad himself is reported to have intended, but which had not been carried out during Muhammad's lifetime for fear of alienating the recently converted Meccans. The new Kaaba was built entirely of stone—the old one was of alternating layers of stone and wood—and had two doors, an entrance in the east and an exit in the west. In addition, he included the semi-circular hatīm wall into the building proper. The three fragments of the Black Stone were bound in a silver frame, and placed by Ibn al-Zubayr inside the new Kaaba. After the Umayyad reconquest of the city, the hatīm was separated again from the main building, and the western gate was walled up, reverting to the general outlines of the pre-Islamic, Abrahamic, plan. This is the form in which the Kaaba has survived to this day.

References

Sources 
 
 
 
 
 
 
 
 

683
680s conflicts
Mecca 683
Second Fitna
History of Mecca
Sieges of Mecca
680s in the Umayyad Caliphate
Hejaz under the Umayyad Caliphate